The FIS Nordic Junior and U23 World Ski Championships 2020 took place in Oberwiesenthal, Germany from 29 February to 8 March 2020. This was the 43rd Junior World Championships and the 15th Under-23 World Championships in nordic skiing.

New competitions this year was mixed relay in the U23's cross-country skiing and mixed team competition in nordic combined. The men's normal hill/5 km event in nordic combined was removed.

Schedule
All times are in Central European Time (CET).

Cross-country

Nordic combined

Ski jumping

Medal summary

Junior events

Cross-country skiing

Nordic combined

Ski jumping

Under-23 events

Cross-country skiing

Medal Tables

All events

Junior events

Under-23 events

References

External links
Official website

2020
2020 in cross-country skiing
2020 in ski jumping
Junior World Ski Championships
2020 in German sport
2020 in youth sport
International sports competitions hosted by Germany
February 2020 sports events in Germany
March 2020 sports events in Germany